Initially rising from the ashes of Northern California hardcore bands, Some Still Believe and Breaker Breaker; Allegiance was a San Francisco Bay Area-based straight edge hardcore punk band that existed from April 2002 to February 2008. The majority of their catalog was released by the popular Bay Area hardcore punk record label Rivalry Records. Although they were not the first band to use the name "Allegiance", they were the first notable American band to do so. Throughout their existence, the band were regulars at local DIY-Punk venue 924 Gilman in Berkeley, California, where they played both their first and final shows. Allegiance extensively toured the West Coast and throughout the rest of the United States and Europe. During this time, they performed at various music festivals such as Positive Numbers, Sound & Fury, Rivalry Records Showcase, Death Or Glory, Sink With Cali, Pressure Festival, and Hellfest.

Discography

Videography

Band Members
Final Lineup
John "Eightclip" Jenkins - vocals (Berthold City, Right On, Sacred, T21)
Duane Harris - guitar (Some Still Believe, Internal Affairs, Foreign Nature, Caged View)
Ross Trenary - guitar (Some Still Believe, Sacred, Caged View)
Isaac Fratini - drums (Killing the Dream, Our Turn)
Dante Campanile - bass (Secret People, Right On, Foreign Nature, Love Hope & Fear)

Former Members
R.J. Phillips - bass (Life Long Tragedy, Purple Mercy, Creative Adult, Spice)
Mike Quirk - bass (Some Still Believe, Set Your Goals, Caged View)
Nate Corbin - drums (Some Still Believe, Geist, Stress Relief, TRY!, The Separation, STFA, Foreign Nature, Set It Straight)
Ben Kinzie - drums (Breaker Breaker, Alcatraz, Dead to Me, Knockdown)
Jonah Nishihara - bass (Breaker Breaker)
Nathan Beneishai - drums (Time for Living, Born to Expire)
Nick Portalupi - bass

External links
Official Allegiance Spotify Artist Page at Spotify
Official Allegiance Instagram Account at Instagram
Allegiance Discogs Artist Page at Discogs
Official Allegiance MySpace Page at MySpace
Official Allegiance YouTube Page at YouTube
Review of "Desperation" at Scene Point Blank
Allegiance Interview at Hardtimes.ca
Allegiance Interview at Scene Point Blank
Official Allegiance Bio Page at Rivalry Records

Musical groups established in 2002
Musical groups disestablished in 2008
Hardcore punk groups from California
Heavy metal musical groups from California
Metalcore musical groups from California
Straight edge groups
2002 establishments in California